God Forgive Me may refer to:
Que Dios me perdone, a 1948 Mexican film directed by Tito Davison and released in English as May God Forgive Me
God Forgive Me, an album by Jake the Flake, member of the hip hop collective The Dayton Family
"God Forgive Me", a song by Madcon
"God Forgive Me", a song by DJ Kay Slay on the album More Than Just a DJ
"God Forgive Me", a song by Ice-T on the album The Seventh Deadly Sin